Avicennia integra is a species of tropical mangrove in the family Acanthaceae. It grows in coastal and estuarine locations in the Northern Territory, Australia.

References

integra
Mangroves
Flora of the Northern Territory
Plants described in 1988